Split Second may refer to:

Film and television
 Split Second (1953 film), an American film noir
 Split Second (1992 film), a British science fiction film
 Split Second (game show), an American-Canadian game show
 Split Second (TV series), a Hong Kong crime drama

Literature
 Split Second (novel), a 2003 novel by David Baldacci
 The Split Second, a 2008 The Seems novel by John Hulme and Michael Wexler
 Split Second, a 1979 novel by Garry Kilworth

Other uses
 Split/Second, an arcade racing video game
 A Split-Second, a Belgian electronic body music band
 Split Seconds, an Australian pop band